Jesus Revolution is a 2023 American Christian drama film directed by Jon Erwin and Brent McCorkle. Based on the book of the same name, the film follows youth minister Greg Laurie (Joel Courtney), Christian hippie Lonnie Frisbee (Jonathan Roumie), and pastor Chuck Smith (Kelsey Grammer) as they take part in the Jesus movement in California during the late 1960s. Anna Grace Barlow and Kimberly Williams-Paisley also star. The film was theatrically released in the United States on February 24, 2023, by Lionsgate. The film received mixed reviews from critics and was well-received by audiences, and has grossed $45 million.

Plot
In 1968, a staid yet respected Southern California pastor, Chuck Smith, finds that his church is slowly dying with an inability to connect with the younger, live-free generation of hippies.  One day, his daughter, Janette, gives a ride to a colorful hippie hitchhiker named Lonnie Frisbee, who says he is traveling around and telling people about the Ministry of Jesus. Smith, at first suspicious of Frisbee, eventually warms up to him and welcomes other hippies to his house. This includes Lonnie introducing Chuck to a band called Love Song, who proceed to perform a song in his living room. They join forces and start a successful movement to evangelize hippies and others.

Meanwhile, high-school student Greg Laurie runs away from his Junior Reserve Officers' Training Corps class and joins a girl named Cathe who "turns him on" to a Janis Joplin concert, with Timothy Leary preaching the value of drugs for self-discovery. However, Greg sees that various hippies are dangerously irresponsible; Cathe's sister gets sick from a drug overdose. Greg and Cathe find solace at Smith and Frisbee's ministry, though Cathe's uptight parents are not enthusiastic about Greg.

The ministry explodes in popularity, being seen as a "Jesus Revolution" or "Jesus freaks", and even sparking a Time magazine cover in 1971. However, Lonnie eventually leaves for Florida after having disagreements with Chuck Smith. Greg offers to take over a ministry branch in Riverside, and eventually marries Cathe and becomes a famous pastor himself. Smith and Frisbee are remembered as founders of the widespread Calvary Chapel movement, and more generally as leaders in the Jesus movement.

Cast
Joel Courtney as Greg Laurie
Jackson Robert Scott as Young Greg Laurie
Kelsey Grammer as Chuck Smith
Anna Grace Barlow as Cathe Martin
Jonathan Roumie as Lonnie Frisbee
Kimberly Williams-Paisley as Charlene
DeVon Franklin as Josiah, the Time journalist
Nicholas Cirillo as Charlie
Ally Ioannides as Janette Smith
Julia Campbell as Kay
Nic Bishop as Dick
Jolie Jenkins as Pilar
Shaun Weiss as Vietnam Vet

Production
The film was announced in June 2018, with Jon Erwin and Jon Gunn writing the screenplay, Gunn directing, and Greg Laurie, Kevin Downes, and the Erwin Brothers producing. Jim Gaffigan and Joel Courtney signed on in the lead roles in June 2020, although Kelsey Grammer eventually replaced Gaffigan. Filming occurred in Mobile, Alabama in March 2022, with several other scenes being shot on-location in California.

Release 

The film had its premiere at the TCL Chinese Theatre in Los Angeles on February 15, 2023, and was theatrically released in the United States on February 24, 2023, by Lionsgate. The film is set for international release starting in Singapore on March 23 2023, with Indonesia, Australia, New Zealand, and others set for the subsequent months.

Box office 
In the United States and Canada, Jesus Revolution was released alongside Cocaine Bear, and was initially projected to gross $6–7 million from 2,475 theaters in its opening weekend. The film made $7 million on its first day (including $3.3 million from previews from the days leading up to its release), raising weekend estimates to $14 million. It went on to debut with $15.8 million, finishing in third place. In its second weekend it made $8.7 million, continuing to outperform expectations, finishing in fifth place. In it third and fourth weekends the film made $5.1 million and $3.5 million, respectively.

Critical response 
The film received mixed reviews from critics, but was positively received by audiences.    Audiences surveyed by CinemaScore gave the film an average grade of "A+", making Jon Erwin the first director to ever have four films earn the grade (following 2015's Woodlawn, 2018's I Can Only Imagine and 2021's American Underdog). Those polled by PostTrak gave it a 97% positive score, with 89% saying they would definitely recommend the film.

Joshua Encinias of MovieMaker attributed its positive reception among audiences to "high production values and a storyline that works even if you don’t care about Christianity." Rahul Malhotra and Simbiat Ayoola of Collider noted that Christian media is an "underserved audience", that "the production company did its due diligence to create buzz", and "despite mixed critical reviews, Jesus Revolution has proven to be rather popular with its target demographic."

Dennis Harvey of Variety gave the film a positive review, saying the film is "polished and persuasive without getting too preachy." In another review, James Berardinelli said that "Jesus Revolution takes a fascinating period of American history – the hippie movement and its associated fallout within the Christian community – and transforms it into a bland, TV movie-of-the-week experience." Film Threat writer Alan Ng gave the film an 8/10, saying " I associate three things with faith-based films: bad acting, an outrageous, overly positive message, and a shoe-horned sermon. Thankfully, this film avoids all three elements." Nell Minow of RogerEbert.com gave the film 2 stars, pointing out that the film skips details like one of its real-life characters' substance abuse and homosexuality, and quoted Jack Kornfield saying "after the ecstasy comes the laundry." Kathy Schiffer of the National Catholic Register noted, "If you're old enough to remember the 1960s and '70s, you'll find Lionsgate's upbeat new film Jesus Revolution to be a walk down memory lane... As a mainstream Christian film, it focuses on a feel-good faith message, which is more than welcome amid today's culture."

References

External links
 
 

Lionsgate films
American drama films
American films based on actual events
Films about evangelicalism
Films set in California
Films set in the 1960s
Films shot in California
Films shot in Mobile, Alabama
Hippie films
Jesus movement
2020s English-language films
2020s American films